Not Worth Fighting is an EP written and recorded by American indie rock band Someone Still Loves You Boris Yeltsin.

Track listing 
"Half-Awake (Deb)" – 2:17
"It's Not Worth Fighting" – 3:06

References

Someone Still Loves You Boris Yeltsin albums
2007 EPs
Polyvinyl Record Co. EPs